Edward Little may refer to:

 Edward Little (rugby union) (1864–1945), Scottish-born South African rugby union player
 Edward Little (1897–1970), British band leader, better known as Edward Lexy
 Edward Little (philanthropist) (1773–1849), founder of Edward Little High School in Maine, US
 Edward Alfred Little (1859–1934), Ontario farmer and political figure
 Edward C. Little (1858–1924), US Representative from Kansas
 Edward P. Little (1791–1875), US Representative from Massachusetts
 Edward S. Little (1918–2004), American diplomat
 Edward S. Little II (born 1947), Bishop of the Episcopal Diocese of Northern Indiana
 Eddie Little (1954–2003), American writer

Buildings
Edward Little High School in Maine
Edward Little House in Maine